was a village located in Makabe District, Ibaraki Prefecture, Japan.

As of 2003, the village had an estimated population of 7,331 and a density of 250.89 persons per km². The total area was 29.22 km². The village was established in 1954.

On October 1, 2005, Yamato, along with the town of Makabe (also from Makabe District), and the town of Iwase (from Nishiibaraki District), was merged to create the city of Sakuragawa.

External links
 Sakuragawa official website 

Dissolved municipalities of Ibaraki Prefecture
Sakuragawa, Ibaraki